Renså is a small village in Tjeldsund Municipality in Troms og Finnmark county, Norway. The population (2001) of Renså is 69. The village is located next to the Rensåelva river which flows into the Astafjorden from the Rensåvatnet lake.

Agriculture is the main economic activity. The football grounds of the sports club IL Santor are situated on the ridge just above the village, which is called Rensåhøgda.

References

Villages in Troms
Tjeldsund